Ulrike Höfken (born 14 May 1955) is a German politician for the Alliance 90/The Greens.

Life and politics

Höfken was born 1955 in the westgerman city of Duesseldorf and studied agricultural science.

Höfken entered the Greens in 1989 and was member of the Bundestag, the German federal diet from 1994 to 2011.

References

 

1955 births
Living people
People from Düsseldorf
German politicians
Members of the Bundestag for Rhineland-Palatinate